The Seal of the Commonwealth of Virginia is the official seal of the Commonwealth of Virginia, a U.S. state. The state flag of Virginia consists of the obverse of the seal against a blue background. A state flag was first adopted at the beginning of the American Civil War in April 1861, readopted in 1912, and standardized by the General Assembly in February 1950. The standing allegorical female figure of virtue is shown having vanquished tyranny, symbolized by a fallen king at her feet. She has an exposed breast in the manner of classical depictions of Amazons, making this the only state flag in the U.S. depicting a form of nudity. The motto, "Sic semper tyrannis," means "Thus always to tyrants." The flag may be decorated with a white fringe along the fly edge; this is usually done when the flag is displayed indoors.

History

In May 1776 the Virginia colony declared its independence from Great Britain. On July 1, 1776, a committee of four was appointed to make a proper seal for the Commonwealth of Virginia. The four men were Richard Henry Lee, George Mason, George Wythe, and Robert Carter Nicholas Sr. Four days later the committee's report for a design of the seal was read, and Mason presented it to the Virginia government. It was voted on and approved that same day. It is not known for certain which members of the committee were chiefly responsible for the design of the seal, but it is generally believed to be principally the work of Wythe.

The seal makers did not want a design which in any way resembled the style of coats of arms used in Great Britain. Because of the admiration for the Roman Republic felt by the Virginian leaders, the design of the new seal was taken from the mythology of Ancient Rome. They also chose a two-sided design, as shown above.

By 1912, many variants of the seal had become propagated, leading to confusion as to which was the actual seal. Thus, Virginia decided to standardize the design of the seal to avoid confusion.

Design

Obverse

The obverse of the seal is the official seal of Virginia and is used on all the official papers and documents of the Commonwealth's government, as well as on its flag. Virginia's Virtus is a figure of peace, standing in a pose which indicates a battle already won. She rests on her long spear, its point turned downward to the ground. Her other weapon, a parazonium, is sheathed; it is the sword of authority rather than that of combat. Virtus is typically shown with a bare left breast; this is commonly recognized as the only use of nudity among the seals of the U.S. states.

Tyranny lies prostrate beneath the foot of Virtus, symbolizing Great Britain's defeat by Virginia. The royal crown which has fallen to the ground beside him symbolizes the new republic's release from the monarchical control of Great Britain; Maryland, Virginia and New York are the only U.S. states with a flag or seal displaying a crown.  The broken chain in Tyranny's left hand represents Virginia's freedom from Britain's restriction of colonial trade and westward expansion.  The useless whip in his right hand signifies Virginia's relief from the torturing whip of acts of punishment such as the Intolerable Acts. His robe is purple, a reference to Julius Caesar and the Etruscan king of Rome, Tarquinius Priscus.

The motto selected for the obverse of the Virginia seal is Sic semper tyrannis, or in English, Thus always to tyrants. This is a derived quote from the famous events in Roman history, attributed to Brutus upon his participation in the slaying of Caesar. (Caesar had been named perpetual dictator of Rome in the same year, and some senators believed he had ambitions to abolish the Roman Republic and establish himself as a monarch.)

A joke referencing the image on the seal that dates as far back as the Civil War, is that "Sic semper tyrannis" actually means "Get your foot off my neck."

In 2010, Ken Cuccinelli, attorney general of Virginia, gave his staff lapel pins with Virtus's bosom covered by an armored breastplate. His spokesman, Brian Gottstein, said the pin was paid for by Cuccinelli's political action committee, not with taxpayer funds.

Reverse
The reverse of the seal pictures the blessings of freedom and peace, as represented by three Roman goddesses.  In the center is the matron Libertas, the goddess of individual liberties.  In her hand she holds a wand showing her magical gifts, and at the top of the wand hangs a Phrygian cap, also called a liberty cap — later made popular by French revolutionaries.

To the left of Libertas stands Ceres, the Roman goddess of agriculture.  In her left hand is a horn of plenty overflowing with the abundance of Virginia's harvests, while in her right hand is an enormous stalk of wheat, representing one of Virginia's leading crops. Aeternitas, representing Virginia's eternity, stands at the right of Libertas.  In her right hand is a golden ball, an emblem of authority, and atop the ball is a phoenix, symbolizing immortality.  On the Virginia seal, the phoenix represents effective government.

The motto gracing the reverse with its trio of Libertas, Ceres, and Aeternitas is Perseverando, or in English, Persevering, a reminder to future generations of the need to persist in maintaining the blessings of liberty. The ornamental border on both sides of the seal consists of sprigs of Parthenocissus quinquefolia, or commonly, Virginia creeper. In 1930 another committee was charged with standardizing the seal's design because of all the variations that came into use over the years. The seals that now adorn the doors of the Southern Portico of the Capitol in Richmond were designed by Charles Keck. What the committee approved was basically adopting the 1776 seal as the standard. In 1949, another standard was implemented, when Virginia's Art Commission defined the official color scheme for the seal.
 
The Great Seal and the lesser seal are the same except for size. The lesser seal is used on commissions of commonwealth officials and notaries, and on other papers which remain within the boundaries of, or relate only to, Virginia.

Legal description of seal

The Seal of Virginia is officially described in the Code of Virginia (1950), §1-500, as follows:

Under Virginian state law, the secretary of the Commonwealth is the Keeper of the Seals of the Commonwealth.

Governmental seals

Notes

References

Further reading
Adapted from Simkins, Francis Butler; Jones, Spotswood Hunnicutt; & Poole, Sidman P. (1964). Virginia: History, Government, Geography (Revised Edition).  Charles Scribner's Sons.  pp 673–675.
 The Virginia Legislative Information System

External links
State symbols of the Commonwealth of Virginia
Virginian Department of General Services store

Symbols of Virginia
Virginia
Virginia
Virginia
Virginia
Virginia